Nepenthes Mensae is a plateau, and classical albedo feature, in the Amenthes quadrangle of Mars. Its location is centered at 9.19 north latitude and 119.42 east longitude. The name "Nepenthe" is a Greek word which literally means "without grief" (ne = not, penthos = grief) and, in Greek mythology, is a drug that quells all sorrows with forgetfulness.

See also 
 List of quadrangles on Mars

References

External links 
 Nepenthes mensae: WikiMars map location
 

Amenthes quadrangle
Mensae on Mars